A general election was held in Mississippi on November 6, 2007, to elect to 4 year terms for all members of the Mississippi State Legislature (122 representatives, 52 senators), the offices of Governor of Mississippi, Lieutenant Governor, Secretary of State, Attorney General, State Auditor, State Treasurer, Commissioner of Agriculture and Commerce, and Commissioner of Insurance, plus all three members of the Transportation Commission and Mississippi Public Service Commission.

The election was generally a success for Republicans, as they held all their statewide elected offices, and won the open Secretary of State and Insurance Commissioner seats, leaving Attorney General Jim Hood the only statewide elected Democratic officeholder. However, Democrats regained control of the State Senate and maintained their majority in the House of Representatives, won a 2-1 majority on the Public Service Commission, and held their 2-1 majority on the Transportation Commission.

Mississippi State Legislature

All 122 representatives and 52 senators of the Mississippi State Legislature are elected for four-year terms with no staggering of terms. The state legislature draws up separate district maps for the Mississippi House of Representatives and the Mississippi Senate, usually after the federal U.S. Census. There are no term limits for members of both houses of the legislature.

Results for the Mississippi Senate

Results for House of Representatives

Statewide officer elections 
According to the state constitution, a statewide officer must win both the majority of electoral votes and the majority of the popular vote to be elected.

The number of electoral votes equals the number of Mississippi House of Representatives districts, currently set at 122. A plurality of votes in each House District is required to win the electoral vote for that District. In the event of a tie between the two candidates with the highest votes, the electoral vote is split between them.

In the event an officeholder does not win both the majority electoral and majority popular vote, the House of Representatives shall choose the winner. The Democrats held a large edge (73–46 with three vacancies) in the House, thus ensuring that any contested race will go to the Democratic candidate.

Governor

Democratic primary

Candidates 

 John Arthur Eaves, Jr.
 William Compton, Jr.
 Fred T. Smith
 Louis Fondren

Results

Republican primary

Candidates 

 Haley Barbour, incumbent
 Frederick Jones

Results

Lieutenant Governor

Democratic nomination

Candidates 

 Jamie Franks

Republican primary

Candidates 

 Phil Bryant
 Charlie Ross

Results

General election

Results

Secretary of State

Democratic primary

Candidates 

 Robert H. Smith
 Jabari A. Toins
 John Windsor

Results

Republican primary

Candidates 

 Delbert Hosemann
 Mike Lott
 Jeffrey Rupp
 Gene Sills

Results

General election

Results

Attorney General

Democratic nomination

Candidate 

 Jim Hood, the incumbent Democratic Attorney General, ran unopposed.

Republican nomination

Candidate 

 Al Hopkins, the Republican candidate, ran unopposed.

General election

Results

State Auditor

General election

Results

State Treasurer

Democratic nomination

Candidate 

 Shawn O'Hara

Republican nomination

Candidate 

 Tate Reeves, incumbent

Commissioner of Agriculture and Commerce 
Lester Spell was elected as a Democrat in 2003, but changed his party affiliation to Republican ahead of the 2007 elections.

Democratic nomination

Candidate 

 Rickey Cole

Republican nomination

Candidate 

 Lester Spell, incumbent

Commissioner of Insurance

General election

Results

Public Service Commission

Northern District

Central District

Southern District

Transportation Commission

Northern District 
Democratic incumbent Bill Minor ran unopposed in the general election.

Central District

Southern District

References 

 
Mississippi Legislature elections